Governor Clement may refer to:

Frank G. Clement (1920–1969), 41st Governor of Tennessee
Percival W. Clement (1846–1927), 57th Governor of Vermont

See also
Governor Clements (disambiguation)